This is a timeline of the history of the Irish Republican Army.

Note: Articles prior to 1916 refer to armed nationalist movements that predated and presaged the foundation of the Irish Republican Army in 1913organizations such as the Fenian Brotherhood, Clan na Gael and the Irish Republican Brotherhood. All claims to use the title after 1922 (when the Anglo-Irish Treaty ended the War of Independence) are formally disputed, despite widespread usage in practice.  There is a further dispute regarding the 1969 split between the "Official" IRA and the (subsequently dominant) splinter groups the Provisional IRA and Irish National Liberation Army, again despite widespread usage in practice.see also Chronology of the Irish War of Independence 1919-21, Chronology of the Irish Civil War 1922-23, Irish Republican Army (1922–1969), Chronology of Provisional IRA actions 1969-present''

1900s: 1900 - 1901 - 1902 - 1903 - 1904 - 1905 - 1906 - 1907 - 1908 - 1909
1910s: 1910 - 1911 - 1912 - 1913 - 1914 - 1915 - 1916 - 1917 - 1918 - 1919
1920s: 1920 - 1921 - 1922 - 1923 - 1924 - 1925 - 1926 - 1927 - 1928 - 1929
1930s: 1930 - 1931 - 1932 - 1933 - 1934 - 1935 - 1936 - 1937 - 1938 - 1939
1940s: 1940 - 1941 - 1942 - 1943 - 1944 - 1945 - 1946 - 1947 - 1948 - 1949
1950s: 1950 - 1951 - 1952 - 1953 - 1954 - 1955 - 1956 - 1957 - 1958 - 1959
1960s: 1960 - 1961 - 1962 - 1963 - 1964 - 1965 - 1966 - 1967 - 1968 - 1969
1970s: 1970 - 1971 - 1972 - 1973 - 1974 - 1975 - 1976 - 1977 - 1978 - 1979
1980s: 1980 - 1981 - 1982 - 1983 - 1984 - 1985 - 1986 - 1987 - 1988 - 1989
1990s: 1990 - 1991 - 1992 - 1993 - 1994 - 1995 - 1996 - 1997 - 1998 - 1999
2000s: 2000 - 2001 - 2002 - 2003 - 2004 - 2005 - 2006 - 2007 - 2008 - 2009
2010s: 2010 - 2011 - 2012 - 2013 - 2014 - 2015 - 2016 - 2017 - 2018 - 2019
2020s: 2020

Irish military history timelines
Irish Republican Army